Pontestura (in Piedmontese Pont da Stura) is a commune with a population of 1,539 in the Province of Alessandria in the Italian region Piedmont.

John IV, Marquis of Montferrat from 1445 to 1464, was born in the castle of Pontestura in 1413.

References

Cities and towns in Piedmont